The Hamburg Ravensbrück trials were seven trials for war crimes against camp officials from the Ravensbrück concentration camp that the British authorities held in their occupation zone in Germany in Hamburg after the end of World War II. These trials were heard before a military tribunal; the three to five judges at these trials were British officers, assisted by a lawyer. The defendants included concentration camp personnel of all levels: SS officers, camp doctors, male guards, female guards (Aufseherinnen), and a few former prisoner-functionaries who had tortured or mistreated other inmates. In total, 38 defendants were tried in these seven trials; 21 of the defendants were women. One of the defendants died during the trial. Twenty of the defendants received death sentences. One defendant was reprieved while two others committed suicide before they could be executed. The remaining 17 death sentences relating to these trials were carried out on the gallows at Hamelin Prison by British hangman Albert Pierrepoint.

All seven trials took place at the Curiohaus in the Hamburg quarter of Rotherbaum.

First 
The first Ravensbrück trial was held from December 5, 1946 until February 3, 1947, against 16 Ravensbrück concentration camp staff and officials. All of them were found guilty. One died during trial. The death sentences (except for Salvequart) were carried out on May 2 and 3, 1947.

Percival Treite, a half-British medical doctor at Ravensbrück, was defended by a dozen former female prisoners, including Special Operations Executive agent, Yvonne Baseden, who wrote letters to the court favorable to him.  Ex-prisoner Mary Lindell testified in favor of Treite at the trial saying that Treite "was the only man who was human, the only man who looked after the sick people as a doctor should look after them."  The outspoken Lindell also criticized the judge advocate, "who was partial and objectionable, had taken on the cross examination of witnesses himself and prevented other questions from being put which might have been [answered] in favour of the accused." Nevertheless, Triete was sentenced to death.

Three more defendants, the camp leader, Lagerkommandant Fritz Suhren, along with "work leader" Hans Pflaum and Schneidermeister Friedrich Opitz (below, see the Second Ravensbrück trial), escaped from prison prior to the first trial. The first two of them were apprehended under assumed names in 1949. They were handed over to French authorities, who were conducting another Ravensbrück trial in Rastatt at that time; both men were sentenced to death in that trial and executed by firing squad on June 12, 1950. Opitz faced trial in November 1947.

Second 
In the second Ravensbrück trial, which lasted from November 5 to 27, 1947, the only defendant was Friedrich Opitz age 49, a clothing factory leader in the camp employed there from June 1940 till April 1945. He was recaptured after his earlier escape from prison along with Fritz Suhren and Hans Pflaum (see above). During trial, he was convicted of beating women with truncheons, belts and fists, starving them for missing the quota, keeping them outside in very long roll-calls, and sending them to the gas chamber for (what he called) "being useless", as well as of kicking at least one Czech female inmate, causing death. He also encouraged his guards to do the same. Opitz received a death sentence, which was carried out on January 26, 1948.

Third 
In the third Ravensbrück trial, the so-called "Uckermark trial" which took place from April 14 to 26, 1948, five female camp officials of the satellite Uckermark concentration camp, were indicted for the mistreatment of women and the participation in the selection of women for the gas chamber.

The Uckermark subcamp was located about one mile from the Ravensbrück concentration camp. It was opened in May 1942 as a prison or parallel concentration camp for teenage girls aged 16 to 21 dubbed criminal or "difficult" by the SS. Girls who reached the upper age limit were transferred back to the Ravensbrück women's camp. Camp administration was provided by the Ravensbrück main camp. In January 1945, the prison for juveniles was closed although the gassing infrastructure was subsequently used for the extermination of "sick, no longer efficient, and over 52 years old women" from Ravensbrück.

Braach and Toberentz were acquitted because they had worked at Uckermark only while it was still a juveniles camp, and there were no Allied women there at that time; the camp was exclusively for German girls, whose fate or treatment was outside the remit of the tribunal.

Fourth 
The fourth trial was held from May to June 8, 1948. The accused were all members of the medical staff of the camp at Ravensbrück, including one inmate who had worked as a nurse. The charges again centered on mistreatment, torture, and sending to gas chambers of women of Allied nationality.

Fifth 
In the fifth trial, three SS members were accused of having killed Allied inmates. It lasted from June 16 to 29, 1948. The judgments were handed down on July 15.

Sixth 
This trial lasted from July 1 to 26, 1948. Both defendants were accused of having mistreated Allied inmates.

Seventh 
Finally, six Aufseherinnen (female camp wardens) were tried from July 2 to 21, 1948. The charges were mistreatment of inmates of Allied nationality and participation in the selection of inmates for the gas chamber.

See also
 Auschwitz trial held in Kraków, Poland in 1947 against 40 SS-staff of the Auschwitz concentration camp death factory
 Belsen trial
 Belzec trial before the 1st Munich District Court in the mid-1960s of the eight SS-men of the Belzec extermination camp command
 Chełmno trials of the Chełmno extermination camp personnel, held in Poland and in Germany. The cases were decided almost twenty years apart
 Dachau trials, held within the walls of the former Dachau concentration camp, 1945–1948
 Frankfurt Auschwitz trials running from December 20, 1963 to August 19, 1965
 Majdanek trials, the longest Nazi war crimes trial in history, spanning over 30 years
 Mauthausen-Gusen camp trials
 Nuremberg trials of the 23 most important leaders of the Third Reich, 1945–1946
 Sobibor trial, held in Hagen, Germany in 1965, concerning the Sobibor extermination camp officials
 Stutthof trials
 Treblinka trials in Düsseldorf, Germany

References 

 Richard Clark,  Ravensbrück concentration camp. Female Nazi war criminals. Capital Punishment U.K.
 Ebbinghaus, Angelika (1987); Opfer und Täterinnen. Frauenbiographien des Nationalsozialismus. Nördlingen 1987. Reprinted 1996: . In German.
 Schäfer, S.; Zum Selbstverständnis von Frauen im Konzentrationslager: das Lager Ravensbrück. PhD thesis 2002, TU Berlin. (PDF file, 741 kB). In German.  [no archive]

Literature 

 Taake, C.: Angeklagt: SS-Frauen vor Gericht; Bibliotheks- und Informationssystem der Univ. Oldenburg, 1998. In German.
 G. Álvarez, Mónica. "Guardianas Nazis. El lado femenino del mal" (Spanish). Madrid: Grupo Edaf, 2012. 

 
1940s in Hamburg
Holocaust trials
1946 in Germany
1947 in Germany
1948 in Germany